DSFC may refer to:

Education
Welbeck Defence Sixth Form College
Dereham Sixth Form College

Sport
Dingli Swallows F.C.
Druk Star FC
Dudley Sports F.C.
Dungannon Swifts F.C.
Durban Stars F.C.